Robert Samuel Weaver (born 1912) was a Welsh professional association footballer who played as an outside-right or centre-forward.

Weaver played for Altrincham before moving into the Football League with Burnley, Luton Town and Bristol City

References

1912 births
People from Rhosllanerchrugog
Sportspeople from Wrexham County Borough
Welsh footballers
Association football forwards
Burnley F.C. players
Luton Town F.C. players
Bristol City F.C. players
English Football League players
Year of death missing